Werle is a German language surname. It stems from the male given name Werner – and may refer to:
Barbara Werle (1928–2013), American actress, dancer and singer
Bill Werle (1920–2010), American baseball player
Donyale Werle, American scenic designer
François Werlé (1763–1811), French commander of the Napoleonic Wars
Jan Werle (1984), Dutch chess grandmaster
Lars Johan Werle (1926–2001), Swedish modernist composer
Wolfgang Werlé, German convicted of murder

References

German-language surnames
Surnames from given names